Khamisia is a genus of spiders in the family Oonopidae. It was first described in 2006 by Saaristo & van Harten. , it contains 4 species.

References

Oonopidae
Araneomorphae genera
Spiders of Asia
Spiders of Africa